is the first opening theme song to the Japanese anime Kirarin Revolution. The song was released as Kirari Tsukishima's first single, who Kusumi portrays in the show.

Background and release

"Koi Kana" is the first opening theme song from Kirarin Revolution and is performed by Koharu Kusumi from Morning Musume, who voices the main character, Kirari Tsukishima.

The single was released on July 12, 2006 under the Zetima label. "Sugao-flavor", the first ending theme song to Kirarin Revolution, was included as a B-side and is also performed by Kusumi under her character's name. The limited edition featured an alternate cover and came with a large sticker as its first press bonus.

A video single was released on August 7, 2006.

Music video

The music video features Kusumi dressed up as her character, Kirari Tsukishima, and dancing in a room full of stars. A version featuring footage used for Kirarin Revolution's opening and the choreography were released with the video single.

Reception

The CD single debuted at #12 in the Oricon Weekly Singles Chart. The single sold 18,125 copies on its first week and 38,650 copies in total. The video single charted at #30 on the Oricon Weekly DVD Charts.

Cover version
A Finnish-language cover version of the song, "Se tunne", by Finnish singer Laura Vanamo, was released on March 25, 2009, by Poko Rekords.

Track listing

Single

DVD single

Charts

Single

DVD single

References

External links 
 Koi Kana entries on the Hello! Project official website: CD entry, DVD entry

2006 singles
2006 songs
Anime songs
Hello! Project songs
Children's television theme songs
Kirarin Revolution
Songs written by Tetsurō Oda
Animated series theme songs
Zetima Records singles